Chenyang Subdistrict is a subdistrict of Hanshou County in Hunan, China. Dividing a portion of the former Longyang Town, the subdistrict was established in December 2015. The subdistrict has 3 communities and 9 villages under its jurisdiction.

References

External links
 Website (Chinese / 中文)

Hanshou
Subdistricts of Hunan